William H. Holland may refer to:

William Henry Holland, 1st Baron Rotherham (1849-1927), British industrialist and Liberal politician
William H. Holland (politician), member of the  Fifteenth Texas Legislature